Koszyce  is a village in the administrative district of Gmina Wojciechowice, within Opatów County, Świętokrzyskie Voivodeship, in south-central Poland.

In 1921, 1475 people lived here. In 1929 there was a catholic church and a synagogue. The Union of Jewish Merchants was.

The village has a population of 109.

A nearby archaeological site revealed in 2011 a mass grave of 15 victims from the late Globular Amphora culture who were murdered in the 29th century BCE. Subsequent analysis revealed that all but one were from the same extended family, and that the bodies had been carefully placed within the grave according to their family relationships.

See also
 Talheim Death Pit
 Herxheim (archaeological site)
 Mass burial at Schöneck-Kilianstädten
 Mass burial at Schletz-Asparn
 Els Trocs

References

Villages in Opatów County
Mass graves